The Committee to Protect Journalists (CPJ) is an American independent non-profit, non-governmental organization, based in New York City, with correspondents around the world. CPJ promotes press freedom and defends the rights of journalists. The American Journalism Review has called the organization, "Journalism's Red Cross." Since late 1980s, the organization has been publishing an annual census of journalists killed or imprisoned in relation to their work.

History and programs
The Committee to Protect Journalists was founded in 1981 in response to the harassment of Paraguayan journalist Alcibiades González Delvalle. Its founding honorary chairman was Walter Cronkite. Since 1991, it has held the annual CPJ International Press Freedom Awards Dinner, during which awards are given to journalists and press freedom advocates who have endured beatings, threats, intimidation, and prison for reporting the news.

Between 2002 and 2008, it published a biannual magazine, Dangerous Assignments. It also published an annual worldwide survey of press freedom called Attacks on the Press between 1987 and 2017. Since 2018, "Attacks on the Press" has been published in digital form.

Since 1992, the organization has compiled an annual list of all journalists killed in the line of duty around the world. For 2017, it reported that 46 journalists had been killed in connection with their work, as compared to 48 in 2016, and 72 in 2015, and that of those journalists killed, 18 had been murdered. A running total of journalists killed over the entire period from 1992 is available on the group's website, as well as the statistics for any given year;  the total was 1285. The organization's figures are typically lower than similar ongoing counts by Reporters Without Borders or the International Federation of Journalists because of CPJ's established parameters and confirmation process. It also publishes an annual census of imprisoned journalists.

The organization works to protect and enhance free press rights within the United States, which, among other efforts, includes its US Press Freedom Tracker project.  In 2017 the project had a small infusion of financing after a $50,000 contribution from US Representative Greg Gianforte.  The funds arose as a stipulation of a civil settlement Gianforte reached after his election eve attack on The Guardian political reporter Ben Jacobs in May 2017, after Jacobs asked him a question on health care policy. Gianforte was convicted of criminal assault in state court in June 2017 stemming from his assault of Jacobs.  He was fined and sentenced to community service and anger management therapy. As a stipulation of his settlement with Jacobs, Gianforte donated $50,000 to the Committee to Protect Journalists, which said it would use the funds to support the U.S. Press Freedom Tracker.

The organization is a founding member of the International Freedom of Expression Exchange (IFEX), a global network of more than seventy non-governmental organizations that monitors free-expression violations around the world and defends journalists, writers, and others persecuted for exercising their right to freedom of expression. In 2016, the Times of Israel reported that the United Nations voted to deny consultative status to CPJ citing concerns with the group's finances, and also because CPJ does not support punishment for hate speech. The ban was overturned and CPJ was granted consultative status in July 2016.

, the organization publishes an annual "Impunity Index" of countries in which journalists are murdered and the killers are not prosecuted.

Staff and directors
Foreign correspondent Ann Cooper served as executive director from 1998 to 2006.

Journalist Joel Simon served as the organization's executive director between 2006 and 2021; he had previously served as deputy director since 2000, and as CPJ's Americas program coordinator since 1997.

In January 2022, the organization announced that journalist and advocate Jodie Ginsberg will head the organization starting April 2022. The organization also changed the title of the position from "executive director" to "president."

Its board of directors has included American journalists, including:

 Stephen J. Adler of Reuters
 Amanda Bennett
 Krishna Bharat
 Rajiv Chandrasekaran
 Susan Chira of The New York Times
 Sheila Coronel, Graduate School of Journalism, Columbia University
 Josh Friedman, Carey Institute for Global Good
 Anne Garrels
 Charlayne Hunter-Gault
 Jonathan Klein, Getty Images
 Jane Kramer, The New Yorker
 Isaac Lee, Univision
 Lara Logan, CBS
 Kati Marton
 Rebecca MacKinnon
 Michael Massing
 Victor Navasky
 Clarence Page
 Norman Pearlstine
 Ahmed Rashid
 David Remnick
 Alan Rusbridger
 David Schlesinger
 Jacob Weisberg, The Slate Group
 Matthew Winkler, Bloomberg News

Former board members:
 Christiane Amanpour
 Tom Brokaw
 Gwen Ifill
 Anthony Lewis
 Dave Marsh
 Andres Oppenheimer
 Dan Rather
 Mark Whitaker

See also

The Coalition For Women In Journalism
List of journalists killed in the Mexican Drug War
List of journalists killed in Russia
Maguindanao massacre

References

External links

List of journalists killed

American journalism organizations
Human rights organizations based in the United States
Freedom of expression organizations
Freedom of the press
Organizations based in Manhattan
Non-profit organizations based in New York City
Organizations established in 1981
Seventh Avenue (Manhattan)
1981 establishments in New York City